Georgios Kourtoglou (also known as Yorgaki Efendi; born 1856, Nigde), was an Ottoman Greek political, legal, and social activist, and a governor in the late Ottoman Empire. He was elected to be part of the new Ottoman parliament in 1908, after the Young Turk Revolution. He was elected deputy of Niğde in the Konya Vilayet.

Biography 
Georgios Kourtoglou was born in Niğde in 1856 to a Cappadocian Greek family. During his lifetime he held high ranking administrative offices in the Ottoman Empire including deputy of Niğde in Cappadocia, a position which he held from 1908 until 1912.

References

1861 births
1922 deaths
People from Niğde
Greek politicians
Greeks from the Ottoman Empire
Cappadocian Greeks
Political people from the Ottoman Empire